Lee Levine may refer to:

 Lena Levine (1903–1965), known as Lee Levine, American psychiatrist and gynecologist
 Lee I. Levine, Talmud scholar, professor of Jewish history and archaeology